Events from the year 1746 in Canada.

Incumbents
French Monarch: Louis XV
British and Irish Monarch: George II

Governors
Governor General of New France: Charles de la Boische, Marquis de Beauharnois
Colonial Governor of Louisiana: Pierre de Rigaud, Marquis de Vaudreuil-Cavagnial
Governor of Nova Scotia: Paul Mascarene
Commodore-Governor of Newfoundland: James Douglas

Events
 Typhoid fever epidemic breaks out among the Micmac of Nova Scotia.
 August 30: Duc d'Anville Expedition, led by a French aristocrat, arrives at Chebucto (now Halifax Harbour) with 13,000 men in 70 ships. His orders from the King of France: Expel the British from Nova Scotia, then burn Boston and sack New England. Disease and dissension within the command structure defeats d'Anville's force, which despite its formidable strength has no discernible effect on the course of events in North America.
 October: Fortress Louisbourg and l'Ile-Royale are returned to France by the Treaty of Aix-La-Chapelle.
 Jacques-Pierre de Taffanel de la Jonquière, Marquis de la Jonquière  was appointed governor general of New France on March 1, 1746, (b April 18, 1685 – d March 17, 1752)

Births

Deaths

Historical documents
Kayakers in Hudson Strait paddle out (calling "Chima") to barter with ships searching for Northwest Passage (detailed description)

On Northwest Passage expedition, Indigenous harpoon (but not its sealskin bladder) found in floating whale carcass

"The Effect of Passion" - Ships seeking winter quarters on Northwest Passage expedition are mistaken for French warships at York Factory

"French by kind offices and a liberality in dealing" have drawn Indigenous people away from Hudson's Bay Company's influence on Nelson River

Summary of King George's War events in Nova Scotia and New York, including disastrous run of bad luck for French naval forces

Nova Scotia Council suspects French force is near after communications with Minas are cut and French warships appear at Chebucto

Fierce storm at Annapolis Royal that blows down barns, roofs etc. also drives privateer Shirley onto rocks, but masts are cut down and crew saved

Council president Paul Mascarene orders Acadian deputies to get locals to supply extra firewood for 300 Massachusetts troops expected

After French retreat from Annapolis, deputies are asked how they were treated and told that failed French naval strike could not be repeated

With plans for New England militia to rout Canadians from Minas, Council lists punishments for Acadians there who in any way helped enemy

As New York governor seeks war treaty with Six Nations, he ponders loyalty of Kanien’kéhà:ka, Oneida and Cayuga (Note: killing described)

Kanien’kéhà:ka split over joining British in war with French (urged by William Johnson) or staying neutral (as advised by French)

Proposed treaty reference to folly of defeated Scots who were swayed by French is rejected by Six Nations sachems as distracting

At treaty talks, New Yorkers call on Six Nations to honour their promise to attack murderous French, and with British to invade Canada

His Kahnawake allies refuse New France governor's order to threaten Six Nations, and ask SN not to join British to attack them

Conquest had probably not been a goal of aborted 1746 expedition to Canada, but "misunderstanding" led to failure to destroy Crown Point fort

"Krick Indians" near York Factory and their appearance, character, habits, materials (and wonderment at how much Europeans walk around)

Detailed description of log house residence, "log tents" and brick stoves built for over-wintering ships' crews at York Factory

References 

 
Canada
46